Burning Horizons is a 1993 EP by Scottish Celtic rock band Wolfstone.

The second track, "Battle", is one of the band's better known performances, awarding itself as the first track on Pick of the Litter, the band's 1997 "best-of" album. It is also on The Best...Scottish Album in the World...Ever!, which entered the UK compilations chart at no. 9 the same year. An earlier version of the song was on the band's album Wolfstone II.

Track listing
 "Burning Horizons" - 5:22
 "Battle" - 3:36
The Battle of the Somme
The Bugle Horn
The Atholl Highlanders
 "The Prophet" - 3:44

Personnel
Duncan Chisholm: fiddle
Stuart Eaglesham: vocals, acoustic guitar, electric guitar
Struan Eaglesham: keyboards
Ivan Drever: vocals, acoustic guitar, bouzouki
Wayne Mackenzie: bass guitar
Mop Youngson: drums
Dougie Pincock: pipes
 Andy Murray, electric guitar

Wolfstone albums
1993 EPs